The NBA All-Star Celebrity Game is an annual exhibition basketball game held by the National Basketball Association that takes place during the NBA All-Star Weekend and features retired NBA players, WNBA players, actors, musicians and athletes from sports other than basketball.

The game was first held during the 2002–03 season as part of the NBA All-Star Weekend in Atlanta, Georgia.  The NBA All-Star Celebrity Game is played on Friday in the same host city as the NBA All-Star Game. However, the game is not held in the same arena as all the other All-Star Saturday events. Instead, it is held on the NBA Jam Session's practice court.

There was no game in 2021 due to the COVID-19 pandemic. It resumed in 2022.

Rules
The game is played with the standard NBA rules; however, there are several rule changes that are used in this game.
Games were played in four-quarters of 8 minutes from 2003 to 2011; since 2012, the game was extended to 10 minutes a quarter.
Each team is allowed one timeout per half. Timeouts don't carry over to the next half.
From 2003 to 2012, the game clock does not stop while the play is not active except for timeouts, the final two minutes of the halves & overtime, or at the official's discretion. Since 2013, the clock stops during the final two minutes of every quarter except for timeouts, overtime and at the official's discretion.
Overtime periods are two minutes in length with a running clock, each team is allowed one timeout during the overtime period, plus any not used in regulation.
Players and/or coaches can be assessed technical fouls and could risk immediate disqualification.
There was no Most Valuable Player until 2005. From 2005 to 2010, the media members in attendance voted for the MVP. Since 2011, the fans in attendance and TV viewers now vote for the MVP through text messaging and social media.
The game did not use the shot clock rule put into place during the 2011–12 season in which the last five seconds of the shot clock were modified to include tenths of a second from 2012 to 2014; the rule was put in effect since 2015.
In 2018, there is a 4-point decal located 2 feet from the top of the 3-point line which will be active during the second half of the game. To score four points, a player's foot must be touching any part of a decal. Since 2019, the 4-point decal has become a 4-point line set a yard behind the 3-point line and the line is in use for the entire game. A player's foot must be behind the 4-point line to score four points.

Most Valuable Player

2003 NBA All-Star Celebrity Game
The inaugural NBA All-Star Celebrity Game was played on Friday, February 7, 2003 at the Georgia World Congress Center in Atlanta, Georgia.

Celebrities like Justin Timberlake and Jamie Foxx highlighted this NBA All-Star Celebrity game playing alongside WNBA players, NBA legends, and other celebrities. Former NBA players and current Inside the NBA analysts Kenny Smith and Charles Barkley were the opposing coaches. Kenny Smith and the Jets wound up winning in a tight-knit game 46–43.

2004 NBA All-Star Celebrity Game
The 2004 McDonald's NBA All-Star Celebrity Game was played on Friday, February 13, 2004 at the Los Angeles Convention Center in Los Angeles, California.

The NBA All-Star Celebrity Game featured celebrities from Paris Hilton to Bill Walton. Although Richard Jefferson of the Lakers led all scorers with 16 points, the Lakers would lose to the Braves 60–52.

2005 NBA All-Star Celebrity Game
The 2005 McDonald's NBA All-Star Celebrity Game sponsored by Sprite was played on Friday, February 18, 2005 at the Colorado Convention Center in Denver, Colorado.

Rapper Nelly, pop rock singer Ryan Cabrera, rapper/actor Ice Cube, and actor Danny Masterson were among some of the celebrities who participated. After playing the first half with the Nuggets, Entertainment Tonight correspondent Kevin Frazier played the second half with Team Denver. R&B Singer Brian McKnight scored the game winning basket as he threw in an off-balance shot that sailed in while getting the foul call with 9.9 seconds in the fourth quarter, and he was named the first ever MVP of the NBA All-Star Celebrity game.

2006 NBA All-Star Celebrity Game
The 2006 McDonald's NBA All-Star Celebrity Game was played on Friday, February 17, 2006, at the George R. Brown Convention Center in Houston, Texas.

Nelly was named MVP with a game-high 14 points and 12 rebounds and hit H-Town's only two three-pointers in a losing effort as the Clutch City Team beat the H-Town Team 37–33.

2007 NBA All-Star Celebrity Game
The 2007 McDonald's NBA All-Star Celebrity Game Presented by 2K Sports was played on Friday, February 16, 2007 at the Las Vegas Convention Center in Winchester, Nevada. Jamie Foxx was scheduled to play but did not play to perform at a concert later that night. Donald Faison started for the East but was traded to the West team in exchange for no one during the second quarter. During the third quarter New Orleans Saints running back and West player Reggie Bush slightly sprained his right ankle and did not play the rest of the game. However, Access Hollywood correspondent and fellow West teammate Tony Potts scored 14 points and eight rebounds for the West team as he helped the West beat the East 40–21 and was named the game's MVP. During the game, Jazz Bear, the mascot of the Utah Jazz, ESPN reporter Jim Gray, and former NBA player Jerome Williams played a few minutes in the game.

2008 NBA All-Star Celebrity Game
The NBA All-Star Celebrity Game was played on Friday, February 15, 2008 at the Ernest N. Morial Convention Center in New Orleans, Louisiana. A total of 17 celebrities took part in the game. The game was marked by a surprise appearance by Dallas Cowboys wide receiver Terrell Owens in the middle of the second quarter, where he joined and played with the New Orleans team. Owens scored 18 points including a dunk. He was named MVP of the game after helping his team win 51–50. ESPN analyst Ric Bucher was the commissioner for the game.

2009 NBA All-Star Celebrity Game
The 2009 McDonald's NBA All-Star Celebrity Game was played on Friday, February 13, 2009 at the Phoenix Convention Center in Phoenix, Arizona. A total of 17 celebrities took part in the game. Basketball Hall of Famers Magic Johnson and Julius Erving, who combined for 23 NBA All-Star appearances, served as coaches for the celebrity teams. NBA legends, Dominique Wilkins and Clyde Drexler, were joined by former players, Dan Majerle and Rick Fox, in the celebrity team roster. WNBA stars Lisa Leslie and Kara Lawson also participated in the game along with four Harlem Globetrotters players.

Previous year's MVP, Terrell Owens scored a game-high 17 points and led the East Sunrisers to a 60–57 victory over the West Sunsetters. Owens, an American football star for Dallas Cowboys, was named as the Celebrity Game MVP for the second year in a row. The game was marked by a surprise appearance by another Hall of Famer Nancy Lieberman in the middle of the game, where she joined and played with the East Sunrisers. ESPN play-by-play commentator Mike Breen also made a surprise appearance as the referee for the game.

2010 NBA All-Star Celebrity Game
The 2010 NBA All-Star Celebrity Game presented by Final Fantasy XIII was played on Friday, February 12, 2010 at the Dallas Convention Center in Dallas, Texas. A total of 20 celebrities took part in the game, including several former basketball players. Basketball Hall of Famer Magic Johnson and five-time NBA All-Star Alonzo Mourning, served as coaches for the celebrity teams. Three former NBA players, Robert Horry, Rick Fox and Chris Mullin, along with Hall of Famer Nancy Lieberman and Dallas Mavericks owner Mark Cuban, participated in the game. The West team won 41–37 over the East. "Special K" Daley, one of the four Harlem Globetrotters player that participated in the game, scored game-high 18 points for the West. Actor Michael Rapaport, who scored 4 points, was named as the Celebrity Game MVP for his defense on football player Terrell Owens, the MVP of the last two Celebrity Games. Owens, who played both college basketball and football in Chattanooga, led the East with 10 points. The Globetrotters, joined by "Curly" Neal and "Bucket" Blakes, entertained the crowd during the timeouts with their signature ball-handling tricks.

2011 NBA All-Star Celebrity Game
The 2011 BBVA Celebrity All-Star Game was played on Friday, February 18 at the Los Angeles Convention Center in Los Angeles, California. The head coaches were Basketball Hall of Famers Bill Walton and Magic Johnson. Their assistants were comedians Ty Burrell and Jason Alexander. Each team featured fake "general managers" who simulated to have chosen the team.

The game's MVP was chosen by voting through text messaging and social media. At the end of the game, Justin Bieber was announced the MVP. Bieber scored eight points (3–11 FG), and had two rebounds and four assists. NBA legend Chris Mullin said of Bieber, "He's got a nice little game... but more importantly, he's got great passion. It looked like he loves the game."

2012 NBA All-Star Celebrity Game
The 2012 Sprint NBA All-Star Celebrity Game was played on Friday, February 24, 2012 at the Orange County Convention Center in Orlando, Florida. Participants in 2012's version of the game include J. Cole, Common, Vinny Guadagnino, Kevin Hart, and Ne-Yo.

Arne Duncan scored 17 points, and grabbed eight rebounds for the East, but teammate Kevin Hart, who recorded 8 points and 6 assists, was named the game's MVP. Hart was also given two technical fouls and was ejected from the game with about a minute to go in the fourth quarter for protesting a call made against him. The East won the game 86–54. Orlando Magic center Dwight Howard coached for the East team and Oklahoma City Thunder forward Kevin Durant coached the West team.

2013 NBA All-Star Celebrity Game
The 2013 Sprint NBA All-Star Celebrity Game was played on Friday, February 15, 2013 at the George R. Brown Convention Center in Houston, Texas. The game featured 18 players, including Jamaican Olympic sprinter Usain Bolt, Entertainment Tonight correspondent Rocsi Diaz, actor Josh Hutcherson, ABC News correspondent John Schriffen, and Kevin Hart. Miami Heat small forward LeBron James and Los Angeles Lakers shooting guard Kobe Bryant served as the game's head coaches.

Josh Hutcherson was the leading scorer of the East Team with 11 points which included three 3-pointers. Arne Duncan and Terrence Jenkins were the leading scorers of the West Team with 11 points; teammate Kevin Hart, however, who scored five points, three rebounds, and one assist, was named Celebrity Game MVP for the second successive year. Hart became the second player to win the Most Valuable Player award twice joining Terrell Owens, who won it in 2008 and 2009.

2014 NBA All-Star Celebrity Game

The 2014 Sprint NBA All-Star Celebrity Game was played on Friday, February 14, 2014 from the Sprint Arena at the New Orleans Ernest N. Morial Convention Center in New Orleans, Louisiana. The game featured 18 players including comedian/actor and two-time Celebrity Game MVP Kevin Hart, Victoria's Secret model Erin Heatherton, ESPN "Mike & Mike" co-hosts Mike Golic and Mike Greenberg, hip-hop artist Snoop Dogg, Actor Michael B. Jordan ("The Wire"), United States Secretary of Education Arne Duncan, and others. ESPN's "NBA Countdown" co-hosts Bill Simmons and Jalen Rose were the head coaches. Brandon Franklin was a fan who won the Sprint's Assistant Coach for a Day Sweepstakes and he served as assistant coach for the East team.

Arne Duncan led the way with a celebrity game record of 20 points, and added 11 rebounds, and six assists as the East team beat the West team 60–56. The West's Kevin Hart scored 7 points and 4 assists was once again voted MVP by the fans; however, due to his lackluster play he passed the award to Arne Duncan.

2015 NBA All-Star Celebrity Game

The 2015 Sprint NBA All-Star Celebrity Game was played on Friday, February 13, 2015. It was held at Madison Square Garden in New York City, home of the New York Knicks. This was the first celebrity game played at an NBA arena in the event's history. The game was televised nationally by ESPN.

This game featured 20 players including Arcade Fire frontman Win Butler, Bollywood actor Abhishek Bachchan, 2014 Little League World Series female pitcher Mo'ne Davis, WNBA player Skylar Diggins, Paralympic athlete Blake Leeper, NBA hall of famer Chris Mullin, and Memphis Grizzlies owner Robert Pera. This game also featured two All-Star Celebrity Game MVPs; 2010 winner Michael Rapaport and 2012, 2013, and 2014 winner Kevin Hart.

ESPN Radio's "Mike & Mike" hosts Mike Golic and Mike Greenberg coached the West and East teams respectively. The West team assistant coaches were film director Spike Lee and tennis legend John McEnroe. New York Knicks' small forward Carmelo Anthony and former Baylor Bears center Isaiah Austin was the assistant coaches for the East team. Actress and singer Keke Palmer sang the national anthem, and Canadian reggae fusion band Magic! performed at halftime.

Although the West led by Atlanta Dream point guard Shoni Schimmel with 17 points beat the East 57–51, Kevin Hart of the East who scored 15 points and won the MVP award. This was Hart's fourth MVP award in a row, a record for the Celebrity Game. Hart would then announce his retirement from the annual celebrity game.

2016 NBA Celebrity All-Star Game

The 2016 NBA Celebrity All-Star Game was played on February 12, 2016 at the Ricoh Coliseum in Toronto.

The game was a matchup of Team Canada vs. Team USA, coached by Canadian rapper Drake, and 4-time Celebrity Game MVP Kevin Hart, respectively. It featured 21 players, including actors Stephan James, Jason Sudeikis, Anthony Anderson, O'Shea Jackson, Jr., Joel David Moore, and Tom Cavanagh, and TV hosts Nick Cannon, Terrence Jenkins, and the Property Brothers. The game also included four NBA legends in Chauncey Billups, Muggsy Bogues, Tracy McGrady, and Rick Fox, as well as Elena Delle Donne and Tammy Sutton-Brown of the WNBA.

Despite the efforts of head coach Kevin Hart who later played in the game in the second half, Team Canada won 74–64 and Win Butler was named MVP of the game.

2017 NBA Celebrity All-Star Game

The 2017 NBA All-Star Celebrity Game was played on Friday, February 17, 2017 at the Mercedes-Benz Superdome.

The game was a matchup of Team East vs. Team West, coached by ESPN SportsCenter hosts Michael Smith and Jemele Hill, respectively. The game featured 23 players, including actors Ansel Elgort, Caleb McLaughlin, & Romeo Miller, and TV host Nick Cannon. The game also includes two NBA legends, Jason Williams, and Baron Davis, as well as Lindsay Whalen and Candace Parker of the WNBA.

The game ended up being the second most lopsided game in Celebrity Game history to date. The East Team's 88 points were the most ever scored by one team, and their 29-point margin of victory was the second largest ever. Even though last year's MVP and the East Team player Win Butler scored 22 points and 11 rebounds, his teammate Brandon Armstrong won the 2017 All-Star Celebrity Game MVP award with 16 points and 15 rebounds.

2018 NBA Celebrity All-Star Game

The 2018 NBA All-Star Celebrity Game presented by Ruffles was played on Friday, February 16, 2018 at the Los Angeles Convention Center. Since the All-Star Weekend was held in Los Angeles, the competition was represented by the two NBA teams in the city with the Los Angeles Lakers (Team Lakers) and the Los Angeles Clippers (Team Clippers) instead of the typical West Vs. East affair like in previous years.

2019 NBA Celebrity All-Star Game

 
The 2019 NBA All-Star Celebrity Game presented by Ruffles was played on Friday, February 15, 2019, at the Bojangles' Coliseum in Charlotte, North Carolina. The Home team featured personnel who either was born, raised, and/or played in North Carolina or South Carolina. Both teams will have one "Hometown Hero" on their roster honoring exemplary citizens who rose to the occasion to help save others in the time of need. Playing for the Home Team is Jason Weinmann, a 47-year-old U.S. Marine who used his own military transport vehicle to rescue New Bern, NC residents stranded during Hurricane Florence in 2018. Playing for the Away Team is James Shaw Jr., a 29-year-old electrical technician who disarmed a gunman armed with an AR-15 style rifle during the Nashville Waffle House shooting in Antioch, Tennessee. The 2019 Celebrity All-Star Game MVP was won by Famous Los, who scored 22 points, 2 rebounds, and 3 assists.

2020 NBA Celebrity All-Star Game

 
The 2020 NBA All-Star Celebrity Game presented by Ruffles was played on Friday, February 14, 2020, at the Wintrust Arena in Chicago, Illinois. The coaches for the 2020 game were First Take analyst Stephen A. Smith and Pardon the Interruption co-host Michael Wilbon. Team Wilbon defeated Team Stephen A. 62–47 and Common took home the MVP award with 10 points, 5 rebounds and 5 assists.

Nate Robinson joined Team Stephen A. for the second half, while Horace Grant joined Team Wilbon.
Former Secretary of Education Arne Duncan was a late addition to Team Wilbon. Smith also received the first technical for a head coach in Celebrity Game History.

2022 NBA Celebrity All-Star Game

The 2022 NBA All-Star Celebrity Game presented by Ruffles was played on Friday, February 18, 2022, at the Wolstein Center in Cleveland, Ohio. The coaches for the 2022 game were NBA legends Bill Walton and Dominique Wilkins. Team Walton defeated Team Nique 65–51 and Alex Toussaint took home the MVP award with 18 points.

2023 NBA Celebrity All-Star Game

The 2023 NBA All-Star Celebrity Game presented by Ruffles was played on Friday, February 17, 2023, at the Jon M. Huntsman Center in Salt Lake City, Utah. The captains for the 2023 were Utah Jazz team governor Ryan Smith and NBA legend and Jazz minority owner Dwyane Wade. 

The game ended with an attempted half-court buzzer beater by The Miz, which would've won the game as a four-point field goal; it was, however, disallowed as it was shot slightly after the buzzer.

Notes

References

National Basketball Association All-Star Game
Celebrity competitions
Recurring sporting events established in 2003